Bikin is a town in Khabarovsk Krai, Russia, located on the river Bikin (a tributary of the Ussuri)  southwest of Khabarovsk. Population:    19,000 (1967).

History
It was founded in 1885 as Bikinskaya and was granted town status in 1938.

Administrative and municipal status
Within the framework of administrative divisions, Bikin serves as the administrative center of Bikinsky District, even though it is not a part of it. As an administrative division, it is incorporated separately as the town of krai significance of Bikin—an administrative unit with the status equal to that of the districts. As a municipal division, the town of krai significance of Bikin is incorporated within Bikinsky Municipal District as Bikin Urban Settlement.

Climate
Bikin has a humid continental climate (Köppen Dfb). It is in one of the most continental regions of the world in terms of achieving summer heat and bitterly cold winters simultaneously, due to the influence of the Siberian High and the East Asian monsoon.

References

Notes

Sources

External links
Official website of Bikin 
Bikin Business Directory 

Cities and towns in Khabarovsk Krai
1885 establishments in the Russian Empire